Ha-108 was an Imperial Japanese Navy Ha-101-class submarine. Designed as a transport submarine, she was completed and commissioned in May 1945 as a submarine tender for midget submarines. She served during the final months of World War II, surrendered at the end of the war in September 1945, and was scuttled in April 1946.

Design and description

The Ha-101-class submarines were designed as small, cheap transport submarines to resupply isolated island garrisons. They displaced  surfaced and  submerged. They were designed to carry  of cargo.

For surface running, the boats were powered by a single  diesel engine that drove one propeller shaft. When submerged the propeller was driven by a  electric motor. They could reach  on the surface and  underwater. The boats were armed a single mount for a  Type 96 anti-aircraft gun.

Construction and commissioning

Ha-108 was laid down on 5 September 1944 by Kawasaki at Senshu, Japan, as Small Supply Submarine No. 4608. She was launched on 28 December 1944 and was named Ha-108 that day. She subsequently was towed to Kawasaki′s shipyard at Kobe, Japan, for fitting-out. Prior to completion, she was converted from a transport submarine to a submarine tender for midget submarines, the conversion involving the reconstruction of her cargo hold to allow her to carry ten  torpedoes for midget submarines and a tripod hoist aft so that she could handle them. Her fitting-out and conversion were completed on 6 May 1945, and she was commissioned at Kobe that day.

Service history

Upon commissioning, Ha-108 was assigned to Submarine Division 33 in the Kure Submarine Squadron for workups. Hostilities between Japan and the Allies ended on 15 August 1945, and on 2 September 1945, Ha-108 surrendered to the Allies at Maizuru, Japan. In November 1945, the U.S. Navy ordered Ha-108 to move to Sasebo, Japan.

Disposal
The Japanese struck Ha-108 from the Navy list on 30 November 1945.

Notes

References
 

 
 , History of Pacific War Extra, "Perfect guide, The submarines of the Imperial Japanese Forces", Gakken (Japan), March 2005, 
 Ships of the World special issue Vol.37, History of Japanese Submarines, (Japan), August 1993
 The Maru Special, Japanese Naval Vessels No.43 Japanese Submarines III, Ushio Shobō (Japan), September 1980, Book code 68343-43
 The Maru Special, Japanese Naval Vessels No.132 Japanese Submarines I "Revised edition", Ushio Shobō (Japan), February 1988, Book code 68344-36
 Senshi Sōsho Vol.88, Naval armaments and war preparation (2), "And after the outbreak of war", Asagumo Simbun (Japan), October 1975

Ha-101-class submarines
Ships built by Kawasaki Heavy Industries
1944 ships
World War II submarines of Japan
Maritime incidents in 1946
Scuttled vessels
Shipwrecks in the Pacific Ocean
Shipwrecks of Japan